These are the complete results of the 2019 European Team Championships Super League held on 9–11 August 2019 in Bydgoszcz, Poland. As with the previous championships there were a couple of rules applying specifically to this competition, such as the limit of three attempts in the throwing events, long jump and triple jump (only the top four were allowed the fourth attempt) and the limit of four misses total in the high jump and pole vault (except when the winner has already been established).

Background 
 Finland, Sweden, and Switzerland were promoted from 2017 First League.
 Due to planned reduction of the Super League from 12 to 8 teams from 2021, 5 teams were to be relegated to the European Athletics Team Championships First League and only one promoted from it (and initially Belarus as scheduled host of 2021 Minsk Super League).

Men's results

100 metres

Heats – 9 AugustWind:Heat 1: +0.5 m/s, Heat 2: +1.6 m/s

Final – 10 AugustWind:-1.4 m/s

200 metres

Heats – 9 AugustWind:Heat 1: +0.2 m/s, Heat 2: +0.7 m/s

Final – 11 AugustWind:-1.0 m/s

400 metres

Heats – 9 August

Final – 10 August

800 metres
11 August

1500 metres
10 August

3000 metres
11 August

5000 metres
10 August

110 metres hurdles

Heats – 9 AugustWind:Heat 1: +0.6 m/s, Heat 2: +0.6 m/s

Final – 11 AugustWind:-1.8 m/s

400 metres hurdles

Heats – 9 August

Final – 10 August

3000 metres steeplechase
11 August

4 × 100 metres relay
10 August

4 × 400 metres relay
11 August

High jump
10 August

Pole vault
11 August

Long jump
10 August

Triple jump
11 August

Shot put
10 August

Discus throw
11 August

Hammer throw
10 August

Javelin throw
9 August

Women's results

100 metres

Heats – 9 AugustWind:Heat 1: +0.9 m/s, Heat 2: +0.6 m/s

Final – 10 AugustWind:-2.5 m/s

200 metres

Heats – 9 AugustWind:Heat 1: +0.6 m/s, Heat 2: -0.9 m/s

Final – 11 AugustWind:-1.0 m/s

400 metres

Heats – 9 August

Final – 10 August

800 metres
10 August

1500 metres
11 August

3000 metres
10 August

5000 metres
11 August

100 metres hurdles

Heats – 9 AugustWind:Heat 1: +0.4 m/s, Heat 2: +0.3 m/s

Final – 11 AugustWind:-1.2 m/s

400 metres hurdles

Heats – 9 August

Final – 10 August

3000 metres steeplechase
10 August

4 × 100 metres relay
10 August

4 × 400 metres relay
11 August

High jump
11 August

Pole vault
10 August

Long jump
11 August

Triple jump
10 August

Shot put
11 August

Discus throw
9 August

Hammer throw
11 August

Javelin throw
10 August

References 
 Results

European Athletics Team Championships Super League
European
2019 in Polish sport
International athletics competitions hosted by Poland
Sport in Bydgoszcz
History of Bydgoszcz